Daniel Singer Geiser Jr.  (April 26, 1917 – November 8, 2009) was an American football, basketball and baseball coach at Bridgewater College in Bridgewater, Virginia.

In 1949, Geiser resurrected the Bridgewater Eagles football on a budget of $500USD after it had been dormant for 12 years due to World War II. From 1949 to 1951, amassed a record of 3–12.

He also coached the Bridgewater men's basketball team to 115 wins over several season as well as coaching the baseball team to a 122–108 overall record, including two Virginia Little Eight Conference championships in 1960 and 1962.

Head coaching record

References

External links
 Bridgewater College Hall of Fame profile
 

1917 births
2009 deaths
Bridgewater Eagles baseball coaches
Bridgewater Eagles football coaches
Bridgewater Eagles men's basketball coaches
People from Washington, Pennsylvania